Yijing Hexagram Symbols is a Unicode block containing the 64 hexagrams from the I Ching.

History
The following Unicode-related documents record the purpose and process of defining specific characters in the Yijing Hexagram Symbols block:

See also
 Miscellaneous Symbols Unicode block, encoding the trigrams that compose the hexagrams

References

Unicode blocks
I Ching